The 2005 Desafio Corona season was the second season of stock car racing in Mexico.

Cars
Ford Mustang made its debut in this year. Pontiac again won the majority of the races. Dodge won the other 3 races.

Drivers

Schedule

Results

Races

Standings

(key) Bold - Pole position awarded by time. Italics - Pole position set by final practice results or rainout. * – Most laps led.

The top 10

References

Desafio Corona season

NASCAR Mexico Series